Peter James Boylan Jr. (born 18 May 1936) is a retired major general of the United States Army. He currently resides in Milledgeville, Georgia with his wife.

Early life and education
Boylan was born in Portage, Wisconsin. He is a 1954 graduate of Portage High School and was inducted into their Hall of Fame. Boylan then studied at the University of Wisconsin for a few semesters. He went on to earn a B.S. degree in military science from the United States Military Academy. Boylan graduated from the University of Michigan with an M.S. degree in 1969 and an M.S.E. degree in 1970, having studied aerospace engineering and systems engineering. He also studied at the Army Command and General Staff College and the Naval War College. Boylan later received an honorary Doctor of Letters from Flagler College.

Military career
Boylan enlisted in the U.S. Army on 10 October 1956 before being appointed to the U.S. Military Academy the following year, graduating in 1961. He then went on to serve two tours of duty in the Vietnam War.

In 1983, Boylan took part in the Invasion of Grenada with the 82nd Airborne Division. He later served in the Office of the Joint Chief of Staff at The Pentagon, Deputy Inspector General of the Army and commander of the 10th Mountain Division. Boylan would also return to the United States Military Academy as Assistant Professor of Mechanical Engineering from 1969 to 1972 and Commandant of Cadets from 1984 to 1987.  He was, and still is, on the board of trustees for the United States Military Academy. He retired from the army in 1992 and was appointed president of Georgia Military College later that year.

Awards Boylan received during his time in the army include the Distinguished Service Medal, the Silver Star, the Legion of Merit, the Bronze Star Medal with two oak leaf clusters and two Valor devices, the Purple Heart, the Air Medal, the Combat Infantryman Badge, the Ranger tab and the Master Parachutist Badge.

Personal
Boylan married Kathleen E. "Kathy" Costa on 1 July 1961. They have two sons and three daughters. Both sons, one daughter and a grandson graduated from West Point. Their son Colonel Gregory L. Boylan has made a military career teaching at West Point, following in footsteps of his uncle Brigadier General John J. Costa (7 May 1925 – 6 August 2013) who retired on 31 May 1989 as the last veteran of World War II on active duty in the U.S. Armed Forces.

Boylan is a cantor at his local Roman Catholic church, the Sacred Heart of Jesus Catholic Church.

References

1936 births
Living people
People from Portage, Wisconsin
University of Wisconsin–Madison alumni
United States Army soldiers
United States Military Academy alumni
Military personnel from Wisconsin
United States Army Rangers
United States Army personnel of the Vietnam War
Recipients of the Air Medal
Recipients of the Silver Star
University of Michigan alumni
University of Michigan College of Engineering alumni
United States Military Academy faculty
United States Army Command and General Staff College alumni
Naval War College alumni
Recipients of the Legion of Merit
United States Army generals
Recipients of the Distinguished Service Medal (US Army)
Flagler College alumni